Germantown High School could refer to several secondary schools in the United States:

Germantown High School (Mississippi), in Madison, Mississippi
Germantown High School (Philadelphia), in Philadelphia, Pennsylvania
Germantown High School (Tennessee), in Germantown, Tennessee
Germantown High School (Wisconsin), in Germantown, Wisconsin

See also 
Germantown (disambiguation)